Meldin Jusufi (born 30 December 1998) is a Bosnian professional footballer who plays as a winger for Bosnian Premier League club Olimpik.

Club career
Jusufi moved abroad in September 2019, when he joined North Macedonian side Rabotnički.

Honours
Željezničar
Bosnian Cup: 2017–18

References

External links
Meldin Jusufi at Sofascore

1998 births
Living people
Footballers from Sarajevo
Association football wingers
Bosnia and Herzegovina footballers
FK Olimpik players
FK Željezničar Sarajevo players
FK Rabotnički players 
FK Radnik Hadžići players
First League of the Federation of Bosnia and Herzegovina players
Premier League of Bosnia and Herzegovina players
Macedonian First Football League players 
Bosnia and Herzegovina expatriate footballers
Expatriate footballers in North Macedonia
Bosnia and Herzegovina expatriate sportspeople in North Macedonia